In mid-July 1951, heavy rains led to a great rise of water in the Kansas River, Missouri River, and other surrounding areas of the Central United States. Flooding occurred in the Kansas, Neosho, Marais Des Cygnes, and Verdigris river basins.  The damage in June and July 1951 across eastern Kansas and Missouri exceeded  (equivalent to $ in ). The flooding killed 17 people and displaced 518,000 more.

Flood

The 1951 flood in Kansas began in May with the flood of the Big Creek, (a tributary of the Smoky Hill River) in Hays after eleven inches of rain in two hours. The creek overflowed, flooding Hays (the location of Fort Hays State University) to a depth of four feet in most locations inhabited by the coeds on campus, necessitating a midnight flight from the barracks (by families of the G.I. Bill) and dorms to the Stadium's third floor, which was still dry. Dr. Charles F. Wiest, Emeritus Professor of Philosophy and Religion, and his seven-year-old daughter perished when their home caved in with the weight of the water while he was saving prized texts in his basement. All records at the college were ruined and no graduation was held on the appointed date of May 23. Graduates were mailed their diplomas a month later.

At the time there were no warning sirens in Hays.  Two police officers drove up and down the low riding streets with their sirens blaring shouting to evacuate.  They are credited with saving many lives.

The flooding continued into June 1951 with heavy rains that month. The flooding reached its worst stages when between 8 and  fell on the region between July 9 and July 13.  The flood levels reached their highest point since the Great Flood of 1844 and Flood of 1903.  July 13 experienced the single greatest levels of flood and led to the greatest amount of destruction by flood experienced in the Midwest as of that date.

The actual flood-levels are not accurately known for the Kansas River, as the water crested above all official flood gauges.

The heaviest initial damage by the flood crest was to Manhattan and Ft. Riley.  Barracks at the Fort were destroyed, and in Manhattan the downtown business district was deluged under 8 feet (2.4 m) of water and two people were killed.  Following this, Topeka and Lawrence were also damaged by the same crest. Approximately 24,000 people were evacuated from Topeka.

In Kansas City, the flood began running over the top of the levees protecting the Argentine and Armourdale areas, resulting in the evacuation of 15,000 people.  Houses in Armourdale had water all the way to their roofs.  The flood devastated the Kansas City Stockyards in the West Bottoms at the confluence of the Kansas and Missouri Rivers.  The Stockyards would never fully recover.  The flood destroyed the TWA overhaul base at Fairfax Airport in Kansas City, Kansas prompting the city of Kansas City, Missouri, to relocate TWA to a new airport in Platte County, Missouri that was to become Kansas City International Airport.

The crest continued downstream passing through Boonville, Missouri on July 17, Jefferson City, Missouri on July 18, Hermann, Missouri on July 19, and St. Charles, Missouri on July 20 resulting in further flooding.

On July 17, President Harry Truman toured the damage by airplane, as far west as Manhattan, and declared the disaster "one of the worst this country has ever suffered from water".

Flood levels

Here are the measured river crest levels.

Kansas River

Marais Des Cygnes River

Neosho River

Outcome

Following this flood a series of levees and reservoirs were constructed throughout eastern Kansas.  This new network of flood control structures helped to prevent widespread damage when the region was hit later by the Great Flood of 1993.

Prior to the flood there were five federal flood control dams in operation in the Kansas River basin:

 Bonny Dam in Colorado
 Enders Dam and Medicine Creek Dam in Nebraska
 Cedar Bluff Dam and Kanopolis Dam in Kansas

Several others had been planned by the United States Army Corps of Engineers and the Bureau of Reclamation, both authorized by the Flood Control Act of 1944.

Since then, many dams have been constructed so that a total of eighteen dams control the flow of the Kansas River, such as Webster Dam and Kirwin Dam on tributaries of the Solomon River in Kansas.  Many other reservoirs and levees were built in other nearby basins which were also built as part of the response to this flood (such as in the Osage River basin above the Lake of the Ozarks).

In North Lawrence there is a building shaped like a teepee. A mark on the side of the building indicates the water was seven feet high around the building.

In 2011 a painting of the flood Flood Disaster by Thomas Hart Benton was sold for $1.9 million in an auction at Sotheby's in New York City.  Benton had made the painting at the time of the flood and sent lithographs to every member of Congress to support a flood appropriations bill.

Comparison to other big floods

Channeling and levee construction have altered how the floods have hit various areas along the Missouri River.  Here is a comparison of the three big floods since the early 19th century.

 Great Flood of 1844 – This was the biggest flood of the three in terms of rate of discharge at Westport Landing in Kansas City. On July 16, 1844, the crest was almost one foot lower than the 1993 flood.
The 1951 crest on July 14, 1951, was almost  lower than the 1844 flood and  lower than 1993. However, the flood was the most devastating of all modern floods for Kansas City because its levee system was not built to withstand it. It destroyed the city's stockyards and forced the building of an airport away from the Missouri River bottoms.
 Missouri River Flood of 1952 – The following year, flooding just upstream on the Missouri River caused the Rosecrans Memorial Airport to be cut off from the City of St. Joseph, Missouri.  This was part of a larger series of floods affecting the entire Missouri River basin.
Though the 1993 flood had devastating impacts elsewhere, Kansas City survived it relatively well because of levees improvements after the 1951 flood.

See also
Floods in the United States

References

External links
 NOAA Article on the 1951 Flood
 NOAA Report (PDF) on the 1951 flood with a comparison to the 1993 flood
 Access documents, photographs, and other primary sources on Kansas Memory, the Kansas State Historical Society's digital portal
 Article from Kansas State Board of Agriculture 1951/52 Biennial Report on the 1951 Flood

 
July 1951 events in the United States
Natural disasters in Kansas
Natural disasters in Missouri
Mississippi River floods
Missouri River floods
1951 meteorology
1951 floods in the United States
History of Kansas City
1951 in Missouri
1951 in Kansas